Jonathan Pablo Tridente (born March 23, 1983 in Avellaneda, Argentina) is an Argentine footballer currently playing for Club Universidad de Guadalajara in Liga de Ascenso.

Teams
  Los Andes 2002–2008
  Querétaro FC 2009
  Atenas de San Carlos 2009
  Los Andes 2010–2011
  Club Universidad de Guadalajara 2011–

External links
 
 

1983 births
Living people
Argentine footballers
Argentine expatriate footballers
Club Atlético Los Andes footballers
Querétaro F.C. footballers
Atenas de San Carlos players
Expatriate footballers in Mexico
Expatriate footballers in Uruguay
Association footballers not categorized by position
Sportspeople from Avellaneda